Thuidium tamariscinum is a species of moss belonging to the family Thuidiaceae. It has an almost cosmopolitan distribution.

In a study of the effect of the herbicide Asulam on moss growth, Thuidium tamariscinum was shown to have intermediate sensitivity to Asulam exposure.

References

Hypnales